Lung Shing is one of the 24 constituencies in the Kowloon City District of Hong Kong which was created in 1988.

The constituency has an estimated population of 15,498.

Councillors represented

1988 to 1991

1991 to present

Election results

2010s

References

Kowloon City
Constituencies of Hong Kong
Constituencies of Kowloon City District Council
1988 establishments in Hong Kong
Constituencies established in 1988